Blue Waters, also known as Langer Heinrich Mine (LHU) Blue Waters due to sponsorship reasons, are a professional Namibian football club from Walvis Bay.  The team is nicknamed Blue Birds, The Birds or Omeva (which means 'water' in the local OshiWambo language) by its die-hard supporters. The team trains at its current field, Blue Waters Sport Field in Kuisebmund, a suburb of Walvis Bay. The team has a local rivalry with Eleven Arrows F.C., which was formed by former players of Blue Waters in early 1960s.

The team play in the country's highest league, the Namibia Premier League. Blue Waters F.C. are one of the oldest football clubs in Namibia, being formed in 1936. Parri Shekupe, Matthew Amadhila, Bobby Kurtz, Hendrik Dawids, Eusebio Kandjai, Moloi Amadhila, Ivo de Gouveia, Phello Muatunga, Salathiel Ndjao, Koko Matatias, Striker Muaine, Dokkies Theodor, Karasa Mupupa, Sandro de Gouveia, Gottlieb Nakuta.

History 
Blue Waters started as a team established at the Old Location for Africans in Walvis Bay by Daniel Shimbambi, a teacher by profession. It was started on Sunday, 13 February 1936 by the eldest in the Old Location who saw the need to start a team for the OshiWambo-speaking community. The team won major cup tournaments, western leagues and formed part as pioneer in both premier leagues establishments in the country. Blue Waters was a founding member of the Namibia National Soccer League (1985–1989) and the Namibia Premier League (NPL) from 1990. The team got was only relegated one for the 2008–2009 league season and gain immediate promotion to familiar territories of the Namibia Premier League.

Club Management 
 Chairman: Hafeni Ndemula
 Vice Chairman: Franco Cosmos
 Treasurer: Sandro de Gouveia
 Additional Members: Martha 'Ouvrou' Muatunga, Robert Shimooshili, Mathew Kambala, Knowledge Ipinge, Sydney Nuwuseb

Coaching Staff and Technical staff 
 Team manager: Tostao Imbili
 Coach: Armando Pedro
 Assistant coaches: Fisher Kalimba and Khulu Hawala
 Goalkeeper Coach: Byron Brown

Coaches 
 Uwe Bachmann
 Slugger Imbili
 Hendrik Dawids
 Koko Matatias Muatunga
 Peta Useb
 Sandro de Gouveia
 Lucky Richter
 Lucky Shipanga
 Shepherd Murape
 Sparks Gottlieb
 Mdota Shozi
 Gilbert Raswoka
 Gerald Gunther

Premier League Championships
Blue Waters won four Premier League titles:
1988
1996
2000
2004

NFA Cup Champions  
Blue Waters won the NFA Cup in 1994 by defeating Tigers 3–0 in the final.

Performance in CAF competitions 
CAF Champions League: 2 appearances
1997 – withdrew in Preliminary Round
2005 – Preliminary Round

CAF Cup: 1 appearance
1996 – First Round

Participation in the Namibia Premier League, 2010–2016 

The following are the achievement of the Blue Waters Football Club in the Namibia Premier League (NPL):
1. 2010/2011 – Ended 7th
2. 2011/2012 – Ended 2nd
3. 2012/2013 – Ended 10th
4. 2013/2014 – Ended 5th
5. 2014/2015 – Ended 5th
6. 2015/2016 – Ended 6th

References 

1936 establishments in South West Africa
Association football clubs established in 1936
Football clubs in Namibia
Namibia Premier League clubs
Walvis Bay